The Object 416 (Russian: Объект 416) is a Soviet prototype self-propelled artillery. It never went beyond prototype stage. It was intended to be a low profile tank destroyer.

History
Object 416 was an odd experimental Soviet medium tank constructed in Kharkov by Construction Bureau of Factory No. 75. Development on the vehicle began in 1950. The technical project of the Object 416 tank was completed in the same year. In 1951 the vehicle was re-designated as an assault gun/tank destroyer. In 1953 the design was finalized after problems with the unusual turret had been solved.
 
A prototype was produced in 1951. After preliminary tests, a number of defects were identified, such as unreliable control drives and rotating contact devices, and many others. Due to the very low angle of the combat compartment, the crew's work was severely hampered. Due to the complexity of simultaneous traffic control and fire management, work towards the creation of the tank was stopped.

In 1952, the Object 416 passed state tests, but was not adopted. The reason was that in many respects the Object 416 was the same as the SU-100P, and in some ways it was worse, so the deployment of serial production was impractical.

The tank was never accepted for production, and only a single prototype was ever produced. The major problem with the vehicle was steering, due to the unusual placement of the driver, and the limited traverse of the turret made firing on the move difficult.

Description

Hull and turret
The Object 416 had a welded hull and a cast rotating turret. The M-63 gun were placed in the rotating turret on the back of the hull. The engine was placed in the front of the hull.

Armament
The Object 416's gun was an M-63 cannon. The M-63 gun was developed at the SKB at the Motovilikha plant in Perm. The D-10T tank gun was taken as a base design. The gun was equipped with a wedge shutter. To stabilize and resilience the gun during shooting, the gun was mounted with a quad-baffle muzzle brake and lowered the line of fire.

Engine and transmission
The tank was powered by a 400 hp, flat V12 engine.

Other features
The Object 416 has a headlight, IR light, MDH smoke generator, and horn. It is typical for Soviet tanks at the time.

Surviving vehicles
: The only surviving prototype is currently in the Kubinka Tank Museum.

See also
SU-100P

References

External links
 
 Самоходная артиллерийская установка СУ-100М в танковом музее города Кубинка
 Военный паритет: ТАНКОВЫЕ ПУШКИ
 Tanks-Encyclopedia Object 416.

Self-propelled artillery of the Soviet Union
100 mm artillery
Abandoned military projects of the Soviet Union